Giuseppe Cavanna (18 September 1905 – 3 November 1976) was an Italian football goalkeeper.

Club career
Born in Vercelli, Cavanna played in the 1920s and 1930s for Pro Vercelli and S.S.C. Napoli. He played 151 matches in Serie A. In the 1934–35 season he had the lowest goals conceded per game average (0.722) for Napoli, a record which stood until Dino Zoff broke it during the 1970–71 season.

International career
Cavanna was the reserve goalkeeper for Italy that won the 1934 FIFA World Cup on home soil.

Honours

International
Italy
FIFA World Cup: 1934

References 

1905 births
1934 FIFA World Cup players
FIFA World Cup-winning players
Association football goalkeepers
Italian footballers
People from Vercelli
S.S.C. Napoli players
Serie A players
F.C. Pro Vercelli 1892 players
Benevento Calcio players
Avezzano Calcio players
1976 deaths
Footballers from Piedmont
Sportspeople from the Province of Vercelli